Società Sportiva Dilettantistica Marsala Calcio is an Italian association football club based in the city of Marsala, Sicily. Currently the club plays in Promozione.

History
Marsala was founded in 1912: it is also referred to as lilybetani, after Lilybaeum, the ancient name of Marsala during the Roman period.

After the First World War it was entered into the Coppa Federale Siciliana which was competed amongst the top Sicilian sides Marsala, Palermo, Messinese and Catanese. Marsala lost in the semi-finals heavily against eventual winners Palermo.

The first professional appearance for the club is dated 1942, when the team ended round N of Serie C in sixth place. Since then, Marsala played 28 other times at the Serie C level, narrowly missing promotion to Serie B in 1960 (second placed in the round C) and launching several young players which then obtained notoriety even at the worldwide level such as, in more recent times, Marco Materazzi and Patrice Evra.

The team declared bankruptcy in 2000, after a Serie C1 season ended with a relegation. A new team, Associazione Sportiva Marsala 2000, was founded as relocation of existing Eccellenza club Don Bosco Partinico. The team immediately promoted to Serie D, but was cancelled in 2004 immediately after another relegation after losing playoffs to Ariano Irpino, again because of financial troubles.

Following the 2006–07 season, four teams were representing the city of Marsala:
 U.S.D. Petrosino Marsala, an Eccellenza team officially based in Petrosino but playing its home matches in Marsala;
 S.C. Marsala A.S.D., a minor local club formerly known as Bosco 1970 that were crowned Promozione champions in 2007, being therefore elected to play Eccellenza the following season;
 U.S. Kennedy J.F., a Prima Categoria club hailing from the local frazione of Birgi, home of the Trapani-Birgi Airport, that gained promotion to Promozione in 2007;
 and S.C. Marsala 1912, the direct and legal heir of the historical local club, re-registered to the Italian Football Federation in 2006, which played and won Seconda Categoria in 2006–2007.

In June 2007, after failing to find an agreement with Sport Club Marsala, Marsala 1912 agreed for a merger with Kennedy Birgi. The new club assumed the denomination of A.S.D. S.C. Marsala 1912 and took part to the 2007–08 regionally organized Promozione league. In 2008–09, Marsala 1912 won promotion to Eccellenza through play-offs, after defeating Palermo-based club Sporting Arenella in the final, so they played in the Italian 6th tier the following season.

In the season 2011–12 it was relegated to Eccellenza.

Colors and badge
The official and historical colours of the club are white and blue.

Notable former managers
 Carmelo Di Bella
 Pasquale Marino
 Ettore Trevisan

References

External links
 

 
Football clubs in Italy
Marsala
Football clubs in Sicily
Association football clubs established in 1912
Serie C clubs
1912 establishments in Italy